Squash was contested at the 2019 South Asian Games. Squash competitions were held at the International Sports Complex, Satdobato, in Lalitpur, Nepal from 6 to 10 December 2019.

Medal summary

Medals

Medalists

References

2019 South Asian Games
Events at the 2019 South Asian Games
South Asian Games
Squash at the South Asian Games